Martín Garralaga (10 November 1894 – 12 June 1981) was a Spanish actor who worked in Hollywood from the 1930s through the 1960s. He was married to opera singer and actress Rosa Rey.

Biography
Garralaga first came to the United States when he sailed from Santo Domingo, Dominican Republic, to San Juan, Puerto Rico, on the steamship Catherine in April 1924. He acted in more than two hundred roles in film and television and is probably best known for his portrayal of "Pancho" in the early Cisco Kid films.

In 1958, Garralaga was cast as Ramirez in the episode "A Tree for Planting" of the CBS western television series, The Texan. Lurene Tuttle and Paul Fix were cast in the episode as Amy Bofert and Bert Gorman, respectively. In the storyline, series character Bill Longley (Rory Calhoun) comes to the aid of a distressed Mexican farmer, Ramirez, whose peach orchards are being overrun by cattle ranchers.

Garralaga appeared as Father Mariano, a mission priest, in the 1954 episode "The Saint's Portrait" of the syndicated anthology series Death Valley Days, hosted by Stanley Andrews. In the story line, a painting of Saint Joseph is thought by a tribe and its covetous neighbor to be magical. However, Father Mariano reveals its deeper meaning. The episode also starred Rico Alaniz, George J. Lewis, Eugenia Paul, and Chief Thundercloud.

In 1955, he appeared as Mr. Delgado on the TV Western Cheyenne in the episode "Border Showdown."
 
Garralaga died at the age of 86 in Woodland Hills, a part of Los Angeles.

Serial filmography

Charros, gauchos y manolas (1930) - Spanish artist
King of Jazz (1930) - Emcee - Spanish Version
El hombre malo (1930) - Bradley
El precio de un beso (1930)
El último de los Vargas (1930) - Erche
Mr. Wu (1930) - Mr. Holman
Sevilla de mis amores (1930) - Enrique Varga
Los que danzan (1930) - Pat Hogan
De frente, marchen (1930) - El capitán Scott
La llama sagrada (1931) - Mauricio Taylor
La gran jornada (1931) - Martin
La dama atrevida (1931) - Carlos Townsend
Cuerpo y alma (1931) - Young
There Were Thirteen (1931) - John Ross
The Gay Caballero (1932) - Manuel
Marido y mujer (1932)
El rey de los gitanos (1933) - Gregor
Dos noches (1933) - Pedro Hernádez
No dejes la puerta abierta (1933) - Entrenador
Yo, tú y ella (1933) - Minor Role (uncredited)
La cruz y la espada (1934) - Jaime
Un capitan de Cosacos (1934) - Ordenanza
The Singer of Naples (1935) - Beppo
George White's 1935 Scandals (1935) - Spaniard (uncredited)
In Caliente (1935) - Waiter (uncredited)
Under the Pampas Moon (1935) - Court Clerk (uncredited)
Angelina o el honor de un brigadier (1935) - Pedro
Piernas de seda (1935) - Evans
Rosa de Francia (1935) - El marqués de Grimaldo
Te quiero con locura (1935) - Director
The Law of 45's (1935) - Joe Sanchez
De la sartén al fuego (1935) - Subteniente Cartellini
Lawless Border (1935) - Sanchez
A Message to Garcia (1936) - Rodríguez
The Border Patrolman (1936) - Carlos - Cantina Proprietor (uncredited)
Anthony Adverse (1936) - Arab (uncredited)
The Charge of the Light Brigade (1936) - Panjari (uncredited)
Song of the Gringo (1936) - Don Esteban Valle
Smoke Tree Range (1937) - Pio (uncredited)
Another Dawn (1937) - Ali - Roark's Servant (uncredited)
Riders of the Rockies (1937) - Rurale Captain Mendoza
Boots of Destiny (1937) - Jose Vasco
Love Under Fire (1937) - Luis (uncredited)
The Sheik Steps Out (1937) - Hotel Clerk (uncredited)
The Mysterious Pilot (1937, Serial) - Babette's Dance Partner (uncredited)
Rose of the Rio Grande (1938) - Luis
Four Men and a Prayer (1938) - Native (uncredited)
Air Devils (1938) - Conspirator (uncredited)
Outlaw Express (1938) - Don Ricardo Hernandez
Mis dos amores (1938) - Alfonso Hernandez
Starlight Over Texas (1938) - Captain Gomez
The Law West of Tombstone (1938) - Chuy - Joey's Father (uncredited)
El trovador de la radio (1938) - Store Manager
Di que me quieres (1939) - Desparrat
Juarez (1939) - Negroni
Forged Passport (1939) - Scott's Mexican Waiter (uncredited)
Bachelor Father (1939) - Pérez
Panama Lady (1939) - Panama Policeman (uncredited)
Code of the Secret Service (1939) - Mexican Soldier Playing Strip Poker (uncredited)
The Girl from Mexico (1939) - Carmelita's Relative (uncredited)
Overland with Kit Carson (1939, Serial) - Col. Martino (Ch. 3) (uncredited)
Mutiny on the Blackhawk (1939) - (uncredited)
The Fighting Gringo (1939) - Pedro
Law of the Pampas (1939) - Bolo-Carrier (uncredited)
Another Thin Man (1939) - Pedro - the Informant (uncredited)
The Mad Empress (1939) - General Miramar (uncredited)
El rancho del pinar (1939) - Adobe
Legion of the Lawless (1940) - Blacksmith Manuel (uncredited)
Rhythm of the Rio Grande (1940) - Pablo - Bandit
Stage to Chino (1940) - Pedro
Rangers of Fortune (1940) - Mexican Officer (uncredited)
Wagon Train (1940) - Buyer of Beans (uncredited)
Meet the Wildcat (1940) - Policeman (uncredited)
Doomed Caravan (1941) - Padre (uncredited)
The Son of Davy Crockett (1941) - Mexican Leader (uncredited)
Our Wife (1941) - Cuban Driver (uncredited)
Law of the Tropics (1941) - Pedro - Bookkeeper (uncredited)
International Lady (1941) - Lisbon Cab Driver (uncredited)
The Night of January 16th (1941) - Cuban Policeman (uncredited)
The Lady Has Plans (1942) - Maitre D' (uncredited)
Spy Smasher (1942, Serial) - Commandant [Ch. 2] (uncredited)
Ship Ahoy (1942) - Hotel Clerk (uncredited)
In Old California (1942) - Señor Alvarez (uncredited)
Undercover Man (1942) - Cortez (uncredited)
Casablanca (1942) - Headwaiter at Rick's (uncredited)
The Outlaw (1943) - Mike - Waiter (uncredited)
For Whom the Bell Tolls (1943) - Captain Mora
Adventure in Iraq (1943) - High Priest
How to Operate Behind Enemy Lines (1943) - Enemy Agent Y (uncredited)
The Purple Heart (1944) - Manuel Siva (uncredited)
Voice in the Wind (1944) - Policeman
The Laramie Trail (1944) - Don Louis Alarcon
Tampico (1944) - Able Seaman Serra (uncredited)
Going My Way (1944) - Zuñiga (uncredited)
Man from Frisco (1944) - Mexican (uncredited)
The Hairy Ape (1944) - Spanish Official at Dock (uncredited)
The Conspirators (1944) - Detective Outside Pawnshop (uncredited)
Black Arrow (1944, Serial) - Pancho
The Cisco Kid Returns (1945) - Pancho Gonzales
In Old New Mexico (1945) - Pancho Gonzales
West of the Pecos (1945) - Don Manuel
South of the Rio Grande (1945) - Pancho
Voice of the Whistler (1945) - Tony, Fruit Peddler (uncredited)
Mexicana (1945) - Policeman
Yolanda and the Thief (1945) - Police Official on Train (uncredited)
Masquerade in Mexico (1945) - Jose (uncredited)
The Sailor Takes a Wife (1945) - Brazilian Officer (uncredited)
Adventure (1945) - Nick - Bartender (uncredited)
Perilous Holiday (1946) - Manuel Perez (uncredited)
The Gay Cavalier (1946) - Don Felipe Geralda
Mysterious Intruder (1946) - Detective (uncredited)
The Virginian (1946) - Spanish Ed (uncredited)
South of Monterey (1946) - Commandante Auturo Morales
Strange Voyage (1946) - Manuel
Personality Kid (1946) - Melendez (uncredited)
Monsieur Beaucaire (1946) - Spanish Servant (uncredited)
The Thrill of Brazil (1946) - Alberto - the Waiter (uncredited)
Don Ricardo Returns (1946) - Miguel Porcoreno
Beauty and the Bandit (1946) - Dr. Juan Valegra
Plainsman and the Lady (1946) - Alvarades (uncredited)
The Chase (1946) - Havana Cabman (uncredited)
Riding the California Trail (1947) - Don José Ramirez
California (1947) - Mexican Sheepherder (uncredited)
Apache Rose (1947) - Cafe Host Who Arrives with Rosa (uncredited)
Carnival in Costa Rica (1947) - Cabbie (uncredited)
Twilight on the Rio Grande (1947) - Mucho Pesos
Honeymoon (1947) - Official (uncredited)
Jungle Flight (1947) - Hotel Desk Clerk (uncredited)
Framed (1947) - Cafe Janitor (uncredited)
Gunfighters (1947) - Padre (uncredited)
Ride the Pink Horse (1947) - Bartender
The Lost Moment (1947) - Waiter (uncredited)
The Senator Was Indiscreet (1947) - Italian Waiter (uncredited)
Tycoon (1947) - Chávez
The Treasure of the Sierra Madre (1948) - Railroad Conductor (uncredited)
Madonna of the Desert (1948) - Papa Baravelli
Port Said (1948) - Hotel Porter
Up in Central Park (1948) - Bertolli (uncredited)
Four Faces West (1948) - Florencio
Rogues' Regiment (1948) - Hazaret
The Saxon Charm (1948) - Manager (uncredited)
Shep Comes Home (1948) - Manuel Ortiz
The Feathered Serpent (1948) - Pedro Francisco Lopez
The Big Sombrero (1949) - Felipe Gonzales
The Bribe (1949) - Pablo Gomez
The Last Bandit (1949) - Patrick Moreno
Streets of San Francisco (1949) - Rocco
Susanna Pass (1949) - Carlos
The Great Sinner (1949) - Maharajah (uncredited)
Jolson Sings Again (1949) - Mr. Estrada (uncredited)
Joe Palooka in the Counterpunch (1949) - Announcer
Sword in the Desert (1949) - Ahmed the Great (uncredited)
Holiday in Havana (1949) - Mr. Estrada (uncredited)
Border Incident (1949) - Col. Rafael Alvarado (uncredited)
There's a Girl in My Heart (1949) - Luigi
The Outriders (1950) - Father Damasco
The Kid from Texas (1950) - Morales
Fortunes of Captain Blood (1950) - Antonio Viamonte
Crisis (1950) - Señor Magano (uncredited)
A Lady Without Passport (1950) - Policeman (uncredited)
Branded (1950) - Hernandez
The Bandit Queen (1950) - Father Antonio
Havana Rose (1951) - Philip
Bride of the Gorilla (1951) - Native
The Fighter (1952) - Luis Rivera
5 Fingers (1952) - Diello's Butler (uncredited)
The Fabulous Senorita (1952) - Police Captain Garcia
African Treasure (1952) - Pedro Sebastian
Captain Pirate (1952) - Turk (uncredited)
Bela Lugosi Meets a Brooklyn Gorilla (1952) - Pepe Bordo / Waiter
The Snows of Kilimanjaro (1952) - Spanish Officer (uncredited)
The Ring (1952) - Vidal Cantanios
Tropical Heat Wave (1952) - Ignacio Ortega
Woman in the Dark (1952) - 'Papa' Morello
Adventures of Superman (1952-1955, TV Series) - Pedro / Chief of Police
Tropic Zone (1953) - Croupier (uncredited)
San Antone (1953) - Phillipa (uncredited)
The Hitch-Hiker (1953) - Bartender (uncredited)
Law and Order (1953) - Mexican Blacksmith (uncredited)
Second Chance (1953) - Don Pascual (uncredited)
Captain Scarface (1953) - Manuel
Border River (1954) - Guzman
Jubilee Trail (1954) - Don Rafael Velasco
Secret of the Incas (1954) - (uncredited)
The Law vs. Billy the Kid (1954) - Miguel Bolanos (uncredited)
Green Fire (1954) - Gonzales (uncredited)
Interrupted Melody (1955) - Dr. Ortega (uncredited)
A Man Alone (1955) - Ortega
Serenade (1956) - Romero (uncredited)
Blackjack Ketchum, Desperado (1956) - Jaime Brigo
The Unknown Terror (1957) - Old Native Villager
Tip on a Dead Jockey (1957) - Pietro (uncredited)
Gunsight Ridge (1957) - Ramon (uncredited)
Man in the Shadow (1957) - Jesus Cisneros
The Left Handed Gun (1958) - Saval
Gunmen from Laredo (1959) - Jaro (uncredited)
It Started with a Kiss (1959) - Señor Lagonzaga (uncredited)
Cry Tough (1959) - Angry Man on Street (uncredited)
The Last Angry Man (1959) - Angelo Travicanti - Neighbor-Patient (uncredited)
Bat Masterson (1960) - Pia Anselm
Lonely Are the Brave (1962) - Old Man
Fun in Acapulco (1963) - Manager of the Tropicana Hotel (uncredited)
Island of the Blue Dolphins (1964) - The Priest
The High Chaparral (1969, TV Series) - Francisco
What Ever Happened to Aunt Alice? (1969) - Juan

References

 Bordman, Gerald Martin (1995). American Theatre: A Chronicle of Comedy and Drama, 1914-1930. Oxford University Press US. . 
 Ronald S. Draper viewed the movie "Branded" on ATT movie channel (940 ENCWES) with Martin Garralaga having a minor role with the screen name of "HERNANDEZ" as evidenced in the credits at the end of the movie.

External links

 
 
 
 

1894 births
1981 deaths
American male film actors
Spanish male film actors
Burials at Forest Lawn Memorial Park (Glendale)
Male actors from Barcelona
20th-century American male actors
American people of Catalan descent
Spanish emigrants to the United States